'Three-Fingered Jack may refer to:

A Person 
 Three Fingered Jack, a name used for several outlaw characters, including:
 Three Fingered Jack (Jamaica), name given to Jack Mansong (d. c. 1781), the leader of a band of runaway slaves in the Colony of Jamaica in the eighteenth century. 
 Three Fingered Jack (California), (d. c. 1853), a name given to him by the California Rangers who killed him, leader of a band of the Five Joaquins Gang, in the California Gold Rush.  His real identity is disputed.  
 Jack Dunlop, (c.1872 – February 24, 1900), known as Three Fingered Jack, an outlaw in of the Arizona Territory

A Place 
 Three Fingered Jack, a volcano in Oregon.